Me Ivan, You Abraham is a 1993 French-Belarusian film written and directed by Yolande Zauberman. It won the Award of the Youth (French film) at the 1993 Cannes Film Festival and the Golden St. George at the 18th Moscow International Film Festival; and was Belarus' submission for consideration for Best Foreign Film at the 67th Academy Awards. The film was also shown in 1993 at the 9th Warsaw International Film Festival and at the 10th Jerusalem Film Festival.

Plot 
In 1930s' Poland, Christian boy Ivan goes to live with a Jewish family to learn a trade. He becomes friends with Abraham, the son of the family. However, anti-Semitism is rife in their environment, and they flee to escape an upcoming conflict. Journeying together, they demonstrate their inseparability.

Cast 
Roma Alexandrovitch - Abraham
Aleksandr Yakovlev - Ivan
Vladimir Mashkov - Aaron
Mariya Lipkina - Rachel
Hélène Lapiower - Reyzele
Alexander Kalyagin - Mardoche
Rolan Bykov - Nachman
Zinovy Gerdt - Zalman
Daniel Olbrychski - Stepan

Year-end list 
 Top 10 (not ranked) – Howie Movshovitz, The Denver Post

See also
 List of submissions to the 67th Academy Awards for Best Foreign Language Film
 List of Belarusian submissions for the Academy Award for Best Foreign Language Film

References

External links 
 
 Me Ivan, You Abraham at the 9th Warsaw International Film Festival of 1993.

1993 films
1993 drama films
French drama films
Belarusian drama films
Yiddish-language films
1990s French films